The EuroLeague Women (officially known as the FIBA EuroLeague Women) is the pre-eminent basketball league in Europe for women's basketball clubs.

Unlike the EuroLeague Men, the competition is entirely organized by FIBA Europe. In reaction to the 2022 Russian invasion of Ukraine, in February 2022 EuroLeague Women suspended Russian clubs UMMC Ekaterinburg, Dynamo Kursk, and MBA Moscow.

History
EuroLeague Women is the main women's club basketball competition in Europe.

First established by FIBA in September 1958, the inaugural European women's club competition consisted of 10 teams and came about following the success of an equivalent tournament for men's clubs earlier in the same year. The men's tournament consisted of 46 games, with over 100,000 spectators turning out to watch.

At the initial tournament Slavia Sofia of Bulgaria were crowned champions, beating Soviet Dynamo Moscow 64–40 at home and then 44–34 on the Muscovites court. The two-game home-and-away format for the final remained until 1976, before changing to a single-game format the following year.

During its formative years, the tournament was dominated by Daugava Riga from Latvia (then Soviet Union) who appeared in 16 finals between 1960 and 1977, winning all 16 of them. The Latvian club maintains two records that are difficult to see being bettered, with 18 overall titles, as well as the record for winning 12 consecutive championships.

In the nineties, the competition underwent two key changes. The first was the introduction of the Final Four in 1992; and the second was the rebranding of the competition in 1996, when it went from being known as European Cup for Women's Champion Clubs to what it is known as today: EuroLeague Women.

The Final Four format was given its farewell in Ekaterinburg in 2011, when Halcón Avenida defeated Spartak Moscow Region 68–59; before the 2011/2012 season heralded in a new direction for EuroLeague Women with the Final Four replaced by a Final Eight tournament.

Istanbul were granted the honour of hosting the first Final Eight tournament where Spanish club Ros Casares Valencia prevailed victorious, defeating Rivas Ecópolis 65–52 in the final. In its second year, the EuroLeague Women Final Eight moved to Ekaterinburg, where tournament hosts UMMC Ekaterinburg prevailed 82–56 over Fenerbahçe in the final.

In 2014, Ekaterinburg was once again the host of what would ultimately be the final edition of the Final Eight, with the tournament destined to return to a Final Four format for this season. After shocking the home-town favourites UMMC Ekaterinburg in the semi-finals, Galatasaray then went on to become the first Turkish club to lift the title, defeating cross-city rival Fenerbahçe 69–58 in the gold medal game.

In February 2022, the Russian teams and officials were expelled from the tournament by FIBA for the playoffs due to the country's invasion of Ukraine.  EuroLeague Women suspended Russian clubs UMMC Ekaterinburg, Dynamo Kursk, and MBA Moscow.

Names of the competition
FIBA Women's European Champions Cup: (1958–1996)
EuroLeague Women: (1996–present)

Format

2004–2011
The 24 clubs were divided into four groups of six teams, each with home and away games.

The four best-placed clubs in each group qualified for the eighth-final play-offs.

The Eighth-finals were established according to the standings (games won, games lost, goal-average) of each team in the preliminary round. This round was played in a home and away game.

The winners of the eighth-final round qualified for the quarter-final round.

The winners of the quarter-final round qualified for the Final Four, organized by one of the qualified clubs. The semi-finals were played on a Friday and the finals on a Sunday.

2011–2014
The teams were split in three groups, which played each other home and away.

The best team qualified directly to the Final Eight, whereas the next best 14 teams advanced to a play-off round. The Final Eight was played over two groups in a single venue, with the best teams advancing to the Final Four.

2014–present
The teams are divided into two groups, each with home and away games. The top four teams from each group advance to the quarter-finals, played over three games, and the winners advance to the Final Four.

For the 2020–21 season, teams were divided into four groups of four teams. The two-group format returned for the 2021–22 season.

Results

Medals (1958–2022)

 Semifinal losers from 1958–1987 considered as bronze.

Statistics

Titles by country

Titles by club

Stats leaders

See also

Men's competitions 
 Basketball Champions League
 EuroCup Basketball
 FIBA Europe Cup

Women's competitions 
 EuroCup Women
 SuperCup Women

References

External links
  Official website
  Official Facebook page
  EuroLeague history

 
 
Recurring sporting events established in 1958
Sports leagues established in 1958
1958 establishments in Europe
Multi-national professional sports leagues